The Duluth City Public Links Golf Tournament (often shortened to Duluth Publinx) was conducted from 1927 to 1962 and determined annually the public course golf champion of Duluth, Minnesota. Being a municipal event, the tournament was held at either city-owned Enger Park Golf Course or Lester Park Golf Course. Like the U.S. Amateur Public Links Championship and the Minnesota State Public Links Championship, the Duluth Publinx was closed to golfers with playing privileges at a golf club not open to the general public.
    
The first Duluth Publinx tournament was held over Labor Day weekend in September 1927 at Enger Park Golf Course and sponsored by the Duluth Municipal Amateur Athletic Association. Enger had opened just weeks earlier on July 2nd and was at the time a nine-hole course.  Against 21 other competitors, Oscar Erickson was the first winner of the tournament shooting rounds of 87 and 86 for a total score of 173 over 36 holes. Fourteen year-old Bobby Campbell finished in fifth place. By 1931, Campbell was one of the best golfers in the state winning two Minnesota state amateur titles among his many tournament wins during the 1930s before quitting the game at the start of World War II. Newspaper accounts do not reflect on the details behind the high scores shot during the tournament (Erickson was a Minnesota State Amateur Championship contender in 1930) but one can speculate that the course was probably still immature with construction having begun just a year before. Oscar Erickson would not defend his title in 1928 having joined the private Ridgeview County Club and becoming ineligible to compete.
  
Wally Johnson became the first to capture the Duluth Public Links title three times. With his third win, Johnson was awarded permanent possession of the original loving cup trophy. Months after his 1941 Duluth Publinx victory, Johnson joined the U.S. Air Corps after Pearl Harbor and was killed in action at the age of 27 in June 1943 in the Pacific Theater. The Duluth News-Tribune and the Duluth Herald sponsored a replacement trophy for the tournament which was retired in 1952 after Bob Braff had won the tournament for a third time.  In 1958, Glenn Wicklund equaled the feat and retired that trophy by capturing his third Public Links title.

The Duluth City Public Links Golf Tournament was considered for many years one of the more prestigious tournaments for Duluth-area golfers.  However, by the late fifties, the tournament had seen lagging interest. In response, a major change was introduced which allowed golfers with membership at a private club to compete for the Public Links title. The immediate result was an increase in participation with Dave Vosika of Ridgeview Country Club and Leo Spooner of Northland Country Club winning titles from 1960-1962. But, with the inclusion of private course golfers, the tournament distinctiveness was lost and the title of public course champion was inexact.

In 1963, North Lakes Golf Association (NLGA) officials decided to merge the Duluth City Public Links and the Duluth All-City Golf Tournament into one large event to be known as the All-City Championships. NLGA officials hoped that one big tournament open to all golfers regardless of club membership or skill would stimulate public interest and renew participant interest.  The All-City Championships were never held; the NLGA never got it organized. The Duluth All-City Golf Tournament lingered on for another year.  However, the Duluth City Public Links Golf Tournament was abandoned after a 36 year-run and, with its demise, ended the oldest and longest running consecutively-held golf tournament in the city of Duluth at the time.

Winners

1927	Oscar Erickson	
1928	Carl Olson	
1929	Chet Belisle	
1930	Carl Olson	
1931	Everett Green	
1932	Everett Green	
1933	Ray Belisle	
1934	Yngvar Nelson	
1935	Palmer Lee	
1936	Wally Johnson	
1937	Palmer Lee	
1938	Les Christofferson	
1939	Lew Ink	
1940	Wally Johnson	
1941	Wally Johnson	
1942	Carl Peterson	
1943	Jim Koehler	
1944	Ray Peterson	
1945	Al Soberg	
1946	Reider Lund	
1947	Bob Braff	
1948	Bob Braff	
1949	John Olson	
1950	Gary McKenzie	
1951	Bill Cheslak	
1952	Bob Braff	
1953	John Patrick	
1954	Glenn Wicklund	
1955	John Patrick	
1956	Glenn Wicklund	
1957	Gary McKenzie	
1958	Glenn Wicklund	
1959	Rick Liljedahl	
1960	Dave Vosika	
1961	Leo Spooner	
1962	Leo Spooner

References

Golf in Minnesota
Sports in Duluth, Minnesota